Humbert of Silva Candida, O.S.B., also known as Humbert of Moyenmoutier (between 1000 and 1015 – 5 May 1061), was a French Benedictine abbot and later a cardinal. It was his act of excommunicating the Patriarch of Constantinople Michael I Cerularius in 1054 which is generally regarded as the precipitating event of the East–West Schism between the Roman Catholic Church and the Eastern Orthodox Churches.

Monastic life
When Humbert was 15 years old, he was given by his parents to the Abbey of Moyenmoutier in Lorraine, as an oblate, intended for monastic life, in a practice in keeping with the Rule of St. Benedict. He entered the Order when he came of age, and was later elected as abbot of the monastery. He became friends with Bruno, the Bishop of Toul, who was later to be elected as Pope Leo IX in 1048 and who brought the monk to Rome to assist him after his election.

Archbishop
Pope Leo appointed Humbert the archbishop of Sicily in 1050. The Norman rulers of the island, however, prevented his landing there. In place of that post, he was named cardinal-bishop of Silva Candida the following year. It has been suggested that he was the first Frenchman to be named cardinal.

Papal legate
Under Leo, Humbert became the principal papal secretary and on a trip through Apulia in 1053, he received from John, Bishop of Trani, a letter written by Leo, Archbishop of Ochrid, criticising Western rites and practice. He translated the Greek letter into Latin and gave it to the pope, who ordered a response drawn up. This exchange led to Humbert being sent at the head of a legatine mission, along with Frederick of Lorraine (later Pope Stephen IX) and Peter, Archbishop of Amalfi, to Constantinople to confront Patriarch Michael Cerularius.

Humbert was cordially welcomed by the Emperor Constantine IX, but spurned by the patriarch. Eventually, on 16 July 1054, during the celebration of the Divine Liturgy Humbert laid a papal bull of excommunication of the patriarch on the high altar of the Cathedral of Hagia Sophia, unaware that Pope Leo had died a few weeks earlier in April, which some historians have suggested meant the excommunication was invalid. This event crystallized in an official way the gradual estrangement of Eastern and Western Christianity which had taken place over the centuries, and is traditionally used to date the beginning of the Great Schism.

Later life
In his later years, Humbert was made librarian of the Roman Curia by Pope Stephen IX, his former legatine companion, and he penned the reform treatise Libri tres adversus Simoniacos ('Three Books Against the Simoniacs') (1057), criticising those who purchased or sold ecclesiastical office (simony), including kings for whom this had hitherto been normal practice.  Humbert's argument that simoniac ordinations and sacraments were invalid was countered by Peter Damian. Humbert is also credited as the brains behind the electoral decree of 1059, which stated that popes would henceforth be elected by the College of Cardinals.

He travelled frequently throughout Italy during the later years of his life, partly due to the election of the Antipope Benedict X in 1058. He attended the Lateran Synod of April 1059, however. Humbert died in Rome on 5 May 1061 and was buried in the Lateran Basilica.

Notes

References

Sources
 Norwich, John Julius (1967). The Normans in the South 1016–1130. London: Longman.
 Hüls, Rudolf. Kardinäle, Klerus und Kirchen Roms: 1049–1130. Tübingen: 1977. See pp. 133–34.

11th-century births
1061 deaths
French Benedictines
Benedictine abbots
11th-century Roman Catholic bishops in Sicily
Benedictine bishops
Benedictine cardinals
11th-century French cardinals
Diplomats of the Holy See
East–West Schism
Burials at the Archbasilica of Saint John Lateran
11th-century French writers
11th-century Latin writers